Robyn M. Barker (born 1948) is an Honorary Research Associate of the South Australian Herbarium.  She now works part-time,  her duties include maintenance of the Vascular Plant Census for the State. Barker's research interests also include systematics and several plant genera.  She is a life member of the Australian Systematic Botany Society. Some of the species named and described by Barker include Hakea bicornata, H. horrida, H. oligoneura and H. pendens.

References

External links

1948 births
20th-century Australian botanists
Living people
21st-century Australian botanists